Paul Vredeman de Vries (Antwerp, 1567 – Amsterdam, 1617), was a Flemish painter and draughtsman who specialised in architectural paintings and, in particular, church interiors.

Life
He was a son of the Dutch-born architect, painter and engineer Hans Vredeman de Vries who at the time was working in the Southern Netherlands.  In 1564 his father had fled to Antwerp from Mechelen, where he had been living in order to escape the Inquisition.  He trained with his father who  was as a painter interested in perspective and therefore painted mainly architectural paintings.

He is known to have collaborated with his father in the completion of large assignments. He worked in Danzig from 1592 to 1595 where his father was employed in the design of defensive works.  He worked in Prague from 1596 to 1599 where he painted the ceilings and the reception rooms of Emperor Rudolf II’s castle.  He was active in Amsterdam from 1599 to 1617.  There is a record of a notice of marriage between him and Mayken Godelet issued in Amsterdam and dated 24 April 1601. In 1649 she was buried in Nieuwe Kerk. The year her husband died is uncertain; it could be 1630 when his designs for furniture were published or later, but before 1636.

He was the master of Hendrick Aerts and Isaak van den Blocke, both artists of Flemish descent who were living in Gdansk.  His older brother Salomon Vredeman de Vries (1556–1604) was also an architectural draughtsmen and painter who collaborated with him and his father.

Work

He specialised in architectural paintings and, in particular, imaginary church interiors and palaces.  His paintings show a meticulous attention to perspective.  He developed an original poetic vision in his mature years.  The facades of palaces that are richly ornate and the colonnades of which open onto flowered courtyards with fountains and sculptures provide the setting for scenes from ancient history or sacred history. The rigour of the geometric composition, which incorporates the principles of the contemporary treatises on perspective, is tempered by an atmospheric rendering of the light with its silvery shimmers. The interiors are a reconstruction of the interior decoration of his day such as chairs trimmed with leather, embossed leather hangings and canopies with valances.

He collaborated with his father on large assignments as well as with other artists such as Frans Francken the Younger, Jan Brueghel the Elder, Dirck de Quade van Ravesteyn (while in Prague), Pieter-Franz Isaaksz and Adriaen van Nieulandt (in Amsterdam).

Paul was also active as an engraver.  He contributed some of the 31 engravings to his father's architectural treatise entitled 'Architectura' which was published in 1606.  He also made the engravings for a set entitled 'Verscheyden Schrynwerck als Portalen, Kleerkassen, Buffeten' (Various woodwork for porches, wardrobes and cupboards), published in 1630.  These designs for beds, buffets, cabinets and interior porches in Louis XIII-style would influence Dutch interior design well into the second half of the 17th century.

References
 There is an oil painting by Paul Vredeman de Vries in the Hunterian Art Gallery in Glasgow, Scotland("Trajan and The Widow")

External links
 Paintings at Art UK.
 http://www.metmuseum.org/art/collection/search/428368

1567 births
16th-century Flemish painters
17th-century Dutch painters
Artists from Antwerp
1617 deaths